Cuba is an island nation in the Caribbean Sea. This makes it the eighth-largest island country in the world.

Cuba lies west of the North Atlantic Ocean, east of the Gulf of Mexico, south of the Straits of Florida, northwest of the Windward Passage, and northeast of the Yucatán Channel.

Cuba is an archipelago of islands located in the Caribbean Sea, with the geographic coordinates 21°3N, 80°00W. Cuba is the principal island, which is surrounded by four main groups of islands. These are the Colorados, the Sabana-Camagüey, the Jardines de la Reina and the Canarreos.

The main island consists mostly of flat to rolling plains.

Havana is the largest city and capital; other major cities include Santiago de Cuba and Camagüey. Better-known smaller towns include Baracoa, which was the first Spanish settlement on Cuba, Trinidad, a UNESCO world heritage site, and Bayamo.

Physical geography

It was made in three stages.

Cuba is the largest country by land area in the Caribbean. Its main island is the 17th-largest island in the world by land area. The island rises between the Atlantic Ocean and the Caribbean. It is bordered on the north by the Straits of Florida, on the northeast by Nicholas Channel and the Old Bahama Channel. The southern part is bounded by the Windward Passage and the Cayman Trench, while the southwest lies in the Caribbean Sea. To the west, it reaches to the Yucatán Channel, and the northwest is open to the Gulf of Mexico.

Nearly 4,200 islands, islets and cays make up the country. The southern coast includes such archipelagos as Jardines de la Reina and the Canarreos. The northeastern shore is lined by the Sabana-Camagüey Archipelago, which includes Jardines del Rey and is composed of approximately 2,517 cays and islands. The Colorados Archipelago is developed on the northwestern coast.

Terrain
Cuba's terrain is mostly flat or rolling plains, with rugged hills and mountains in the southeast.

Other mountain ranges are Sierra Cristal in the southeast, Escambray Mountains in the center of the island, and Sierra del Rosario in the northwest. White sand beaches (most notably in Varadero), as well as mangroves and marshes can be found in the coastal area. A recent global remote sensing analysis suggested that there were 675 km² of tidal flats in Cuba, making it the 38th-ranked country in terms of tidal flat area.

Cuba has negligible inland water area.

Geology

Maritime claims 

Extreme points

Extreme points in Cuba are:

Natural resources

Natural resources include cobalt, nickel, iron ore, copper, salt, timber, silica, oil and petroleum. At one time the whole island was covered with forests, and there are still many cedar (Cedrela odorata), chechem (Metopium brownei), mahogany (Swietenia mahagoni), and other valuable trees. Large areas were cleared to grow more sugarcane, and so few trees remained that timber had to be imported.

The most important Cuban mineral economic resource is nickel. Cuba has the second-largest nickel reserves in the world after Russia. Sherritt International, a Canadian energy company, operates a large nickel mining facility in Moa, Cuba. Another leading mineral resource is cobalt, a byproduct of nickel mining operations. Cuba ranks as the fifth-largest producer of refined cobalt in the world.

Cuba has historically been dependent on oil imports. As of 2011, Cuba had proven reserves of a mere  of crude oil and 2.5 trillion cubic feet of natural gas, and mostly used oil for power generation. In 2010, Cuba produced 51,000 barrels of crude oil a day (Kb/d) in 2010 in onshore or shallow near-shore development, "mostly heavy, sour (sulfur-rich) crude that requires advanced refining capacity to process." Offshore exploration in the North Cuba Basin had revealed the possibility of an additional  of technically recoverable crude oil, 0.9 billion barrels of natural gas liquids, and 9.8 trillion cubic feet of natural gas. As of 2011, Cuba had six offshore petroleum development projects with foreign oil companies Petrovietnam (Vietnam), Petronas (Malaysia), PDVSA (Venezuela), Sonangol (Angola), ONGC (India), Repsol (Spain), and Statoil (Norway).

Sugarcane was historically the most important part of the Cuban economy, and large areas are still dedicated to its cultivation; in 2018, Cuba produced an estimated 1.1–1.3 million tonnes of raw sugar. The importance of the sugar harvest has declined, with tourism, tobacco, nickel, and pharmaceuticals surpassing sugar in economic importance.

Extensive irrigation systems are developed in the south of Sancti Spíritus Province. Tobacco, used for some of the world's cigars, is grown especially in the Pinar del Río Province.

Climate

Most of Cuba has a tropical savanna climate (Aw) according to the Köppen Climate classification, though some areas also have a tropical monsoon climate and a tropical rainforest climate, with a hot semi-arid climate in the Guantánamo Bay area. In most areas, the dry season lasts from November to April and the rainy season from May to October.

The climate is tropical, though moderated by trade winds. In general (with local variations), there is a drier season from November to April, and a rainier season from May to October.

Cuba lies in the path of hurricanes, and these destructive storms are most common in September and October. Tornadoes are somewhat rare in Cuba; however, on the evening of 27 January 2019, a very rare strong F4 tornado struck the eastern side of Havana, Cuba's capital city. The tornado caused extensive damage, destroying at least 90 homes, killing four people and injuring 195. By 4 February, the death toll had increased to six, with 11 people still in critical condition.

Administrative subdivisions
Cuba is divided into 15 provinces and one special municipality. Provinces are further subdivided into 168 municipalities.

References

External links

 Map of the Complete Island of Cuba from 1639